There are several types of lock step in waltz dancing, including International Standard waltz. A "lock step" is when the moving foot approaches to the standing foot and crosses in front of or behind it, creating a "check" position.

There are several locking steps in waltz, including: the back lock, which is a Bronze syllabus figure; the turning lock, of the Silver syllabus; and the turning lock to right, of the Gold syllabus.

Back lock
The back lock is a Bronze syllabus step.  It is a progressive figure borrowed from quickstep.  It is commonly used as the ending to a progressive chassé to right.

Leader (man)

Follower (lady)

Forward lock
The forward lock is the same figure as the back lock, only with reversed roles between leader and follower.

Turning lock
The turning lock is a Silver syllabus step.  It transitions from a right turning figure into a left-turning one.

Leader (man)

Follower (lady)

Turning lock to right
The turning lock to right is a Gold syllabus step.  It was only added to the ISTD syllabus after 1966, due to its increasing popularity.

Leader (man)

Follower (lady)

References

External links
 

Waltz dance moves